Benjamin Harper (1817–1887) was an American businessman and politician.

Life and career
Harper was born February 12, 1817, in Philadelphia. He was the son of the mariner Peter Harper and lived in Ohio and Missouri before he settling in Illinois in 1850.

From 1854 until 1855 Harper was Mayor of Rock Island, Illinois. He was a Republican. A wealthy hotel owner, he was the builder of the Harper House (1871) and Harper′s Theatre (1878). The Harper House “has been described in superlatives, such as the ‘finest hotel between Chicago and the Pacific coast’” (George W. Wickstrom). The hotel occupied the site of the former Rodman House that burned down on October 22, 1869. It is not to be confused with his private home also known as “Harper House”.

Besides real estate, Harper was involved in the Coal Valley mines, Rock Island Gas Works and the Rock Island & Moline Railway Company. Ben Harper died April 3, 1887, in the city of Rock Island. He is buried at Chippiannock Cemetery.

One of his sons Ben Harper, Jr. (1861–1884) was a prominent building contractor in Illinois. In 1907 another son, Stuart Harper (1872–1910), build a prairie style mansion with stucco covered walls at a cost of $35,000. This building is part of “Rock Island's 100 Most Significant Unprotected Structures.”

Sources
 George W. Wickstrom: The Town Crier. Rock Island, IL: J. W. Potter, 1948. (p. 84-87)
 Historic Rock Island County. Rock Island, IL: Kramer & Co., 1908. (p. 85-87)

References

External links

American hoteliers
Mayors of places in Illinois
Politicians from Rock Island, Illinois
1817 births
1887 deaths
Illinois Republicans
19th-century American politicians
19th-century American businesspeople